Hebei is a town under the administration of Yangcheng County, Shanxi, China. , it has twenty villages under its administration:
Hebei Village
Tumeng Village
Xiajiao Village
Jiangli Village
Yuanling Village
Getaowa Village
Nanliang Village
Beiliang Village
Shijialing Village
Tanyao Village
Jiujia Village
Zhaogou Village
Guduidi Village
Xitou Village
Dongdi Village
Gelaozhang Village
Pingquan Village
Dongjiao Village
Xijiao Village
Yangbai Village

References 

Township-level divisions of Shanxi
Yangcheng County